Crimen may refer to:

 Nullum crimen, nulla poena sine praevia lege poenali, principle of European legal philosophy
 Impediment of Crime or crimen, impediment to Catholic marriage due to conspiracy to murder or death of previous spouse
 Crimen sollicitationis, secret Vatican document on handling some types of sexual misconduct by priests
 Crimen (film), a 1960 Italian film by Mario Camerini
 "Crimen" (song), a song by Gustavo Cerati